Bukalasa Agricultural Training Centre (BATI), also Bukalasa Agricultural College, is a public vocational training institute operated and administered by the Uganda Ministry of Education and Sports (MoES).

Location
The geographical coordinates of the institute are:0°19'49.0"N, 32°36'06.0"E (Latitude:0.330278; Longitude:32.601667).

Overview
The institute was established by the government of Uganda in 1920, as a cotton research centre. Over the years, through mergers with other institutions, the centre was transformed into a comprehensive agricultural research and training institute. In 1952, BATI began offering a two-year certificate course and a diploma course was introduced in 1960. The two main challenges that face the institution are insufficient classrooms and insufficient mechanized equipment for use in teaching modern agricultural methods.

Courses
The institute offers the following courses:
 Diploma courses
(a) Diploma in Crop Production and Management (b) Diploma in Animal Production and Management (c) Diploma in Agribusiness Management (d) Diploma in Floriculture.

 Certificate courses
(a) Certificate in Crop Production and Management (b) Certificate in Animal Production and Management (c) Certificate in Floriculture and (d) Certificate in Apiary.

See also
 List of schools in Uganda
 List of universities in Uganda
 List of vocational colleges in Uganda

References

External links
Website of the Uganda Ministry of Education and Sports

Schools in Uganda
Educational institutions established in 1920
Vocational schools in Uganda
Education in Uganda
Luweero District
1920 establishments in Uganda
Agricultural universities and colleges